Wyoming Highway 251 (WYO 251) is a  north-south Wyoming state road located in Natrona County.

Route description
Wyoming Highway 251 begins its southern end at Natrona CR 505 in the census-designated place (CDP) of Casper Mountain, south of the City of Casper.
The southern terminus of WYO 251 lies on the Casper Mountain summit at an elevation of 8,485 feet and provides access to the Hogadon Ski Area.   Natrona CR 505 continues southwest of the Casper Mountain area and meets County Route 401, which links to Wyoming Highway 487. Highway 251 proceeds northward as it zig-zags down off Casper Mountain. At the base, the southern terminus of Wyoming Highway 252 (Garden Creek Road) is intersected at just under 4 miles. Past WYO 252, Highway 251 now on a straighter course, enters the Casper city limits and reaches Wyoming Highway 258 also known as Wyoming Boulevard at 5.7 miles.  Highway 251 continues northward and changes names to South Wolcott Street. WYO 251 gently curves around the west side of the Casper Golf Club  and the east side of Casper College before entering downtown Casper. The northern terminus of Highway 251 lies at the business routes of I-25/US 20/US 26/US 87 (E. 1st Street) in Casper.

The last  of Highway 251 are maintained by the City of Casper.

Major intersections

See also

References

External links 

Wyoming State Routes 200-299
WYO 251 - WYO 252 to Casper Mountain
WYO 251 - WYO 258 to WYO 252
WYO 251 - Casper College to WYO 258

Transportation in Natrona County, Wyoming
251